Hit Parade 1960 is a 1960 West German musical film directed by Franz Marischka and starring Renate Ewert, Werner Fullerer and Hilde Nocker.

Cast
 Renate Ewert as Susanne Grosser
 Vivi Bach as Ulla
 Rex Gildo as Rex Gildo
 Walter Gross as Oskar
 Kurt Großkurth as Mr. Klein
 Thomas Alder as Peter Axtmann
 Eddi Arent as Dixi Dolant
 Hugo Lindinger as Mr. Grosser
 Gerti Gordon as Hanni
 Gabriele Adam as Maxi
 Bill Ramsey as Singer
 Ted Herold as Singer
  as Singer
 Jimmy Makulis as Singer
 Angèle Durand as Singer
  as Singer
 Laurie London as Singer
 Gitte Hænning as Singer
 Detlef Engel as Singer
 Camillo Felgen as Singer
  as Singers
 Billy Sanders as Singer
 Claus Herwig as Singer
 Vera Fischer as Singer
 The Hazy Osterwald-Sextett as Singers
 Max Greger with his big band
 Fredy Brock as Trumpeter
 Werner Fullerer as Host
 Hilde Nocker as Host
 Rainer Bertram as himself
 Heidi Brühl as herself
 Wyn Hoop as himself
 Gitta Lind as herself
 Rudi Palme as Sänger
 Tony Sandler as himself
 Gerd Ströhl as himself
 Gerhard Wendland as himself
 Nina Westen as herself

References

Bibliography
 Parish, Robert. Film Actors Guide. Scarecrow Press, 1977.

External links 
 

1960 films
1960 musical comedy films
German musical comedy films
West German films
1960s German-language films
Films directed by Franz Marischka
UFA GmbH films
1960s German films